Malina Pauline Weissman (born March 12, 2003) is an American actress and model, best known for playing the roles of Violet Baudelaire in the Netflix series A Series of Unfortunate Events, young April O'Neil in Teenage Mutant Ninja Turtles and young Kara Zor-El in Supergirl.

Early life 
Weissman was born in New York City. She started her career as a model at the age of eight. She speaks German, English and Spanish. Her older sister is Ayla D'lyla, an indie pop artist.

Career
Weissman is a New York City-based model and actress. She has appeared in major designers and brands like Calvin Klein, Ralph Lauren, Levi's, Benetton, DKNY, H&M, among many others. As an actress, she has appeared in commercials for ACT mouthwash, Maybelline, Purell, and My Little Pony.

She made her film debut playing the role of a young April O'Neil in the science fiction action comedy film Teenage Mutant Ninja Turtles, the role played as an adult by Megan Fox, in 2014. In 2015, Weissman appeared in the CBS and Warner Bros. Television's superhero series Supergirl as a young Kara Zor-El, played as an adult by Melissa Benoist.

In 2016, Weissman appeared in the film Thirsty, and had the significant role of Rebecca Brand in the comedy film Nine Lives, also starring Kevin Spacey and Jennifer Garner, which was released in August 2016. From 2017 until 2019, Weissman starred as Violet Baudelaire in the Netflix series A Series of Unfortunate Events, alongside Neil Patrick Harris.

Filmography

Film

Television

References

External links

 

2003 births
Living people
21st-century American actresses
American child actresses
American child models
Female models from New York (state)
American film actresses
American television actresses
Models from New York City